Kyselka is a municipality and village in the Karlovy Vary District in the Karlovy Vary Region of the Czech Republic. It has about 800 inhabitants. It is known for its former spa – Kyselka Spa.

Administrative parts
Villages of Nová Kyselka and Radošov are administrative parts of Kyselka.

References

Villages in Karlovy Vary District
Villages in the Ore Mountains
Spa towns in the Czech Republic